John Pateman FRS (18 May 1926—18 May 2011) was a british microbial geneticist whose contributions included the discovery of intracistronic complementation with John Fincham, as well as developing our understanding of gene expression control in eukaryotic microorganisms.

He was elected Fellow of the Royal Society in 1978.

References 

1926 births
2011 deaths
British geneticists
Fellows of the Royal Society